Liodaptus is a genus of beetles in the family Carabidae, containing the following species:

 Liodaptus birmanus Bates, 1890
 Liodaptus longicornis Lesne, 1896

References

Harpalinae